The 2012–13 Biathlon World Cup – World Cup 7 was held in Oslo, Norway, from 28 February until 3 March 2013.

Schedule of events

Medal winners

Men

Women

Achievements

 Best performance for all time

 , 59th place in Sprint
 , 69th place in Sprint
 , 75th place in Sprint
 , 76th place in Sprint
 , 3rd place in Pursuit
 , 22nd place in Pursuit
 , 25th place in Pursuit
 , 35th place in Pursuit
 , 1st place in Mass Start
 , 17th place in Sprint
 , 20th place in Sprint
 , 32nd place in Sprint and 29th in Pursuit
 , 34th place in Sprint and 19th in Pursuit
 , 43rd place in Sprint
 , 45th place in Sprint
 , 69th place in Sprint
 , 79th place in Sprint
 , 6th place in Pursuit
 , 21st place in Pursuit
 , 34th place in Pursuit
 , 45th place in Pursuit

 First World Cup race

 , 5th place in Sprint
 , 8th place in Sprint
 , 28th place in Sprint
 , 53rd place in Sprint
 , 54th place in Sprint
 , 85th place in Sprint
 , 7th place in Sprint
 , 37th place in Sprint
 , 57th place in Sprint
 , 71st place in Sprint
 , 80th place in Sprint

References 

World Cup 7
Biathlon World Cup - World Cup 7
Biathlon World Cup - World Cup 7
Biathlon World Cup - World Cup 7
International sports competitions in Oslo
2010s in Oslo
Biathlon competitions in Norway